The Light of Happiness is a lost 1916 silent film drama directed by John H. Collins and starring Viola Dana.

Cast
Viola Dana - Tangletop
George Melville - Henry Mullins, her father
Lorraine Frost - Mollie Dean
Harry Linsen - Myron Dean
Edward Earle - Lowell Van Orden
Jack Busby - Emmett Dwight
Mona Kingsley - Madeline Dwight
Robert Walker - Reverend Clyde Harmon
Charles Boone - 
Mrs. Wallace Erskine

References

External links

1916 films
American silent feature films
Lost American films
Silent American drama films
1916 drama films
American black-and-white films
Metro Pictures films
Films directed by John H. Collins
1916 lost films
Lost drama films
1910s American films